The seventh season of the police procedural drama NCIS: Los Angeles premiered on September 21, 2015 on CBS, and ended on May 2, 2016. It featured 24 episodes.

Cast and characters

Main 
 Chris O'Donnell as Grisha "G." Callen, NCIS Senior Special Agent (SSA) of the Office of Special Projects (O.S.P.) in Los Angeles
 Daniela Ruah as Kensi Blye, NCIS Junior Special Agent
 Eric Christian Olsen as Marty Deeks, L.A.P.D.Detective And Liaison To NCIS
 Barrett Foa as Eric Beale, NCIS Technical Operator
 Renée Felice Smith as Nell Jones, NCIS Special Agent and Intelligence Analyst
 Miguel Ferrer as Owen Granger, NCIS Assistant Director
 Linda Hunt as Henrietta Lange, NCIS Supervisory Special Agent and Operations Manager
 LL Cool J as Sam Hanna, NCIS Senior Special Agent, second in command

Recurring

Special Guest Star 
 Michael Weatherly as Anthony "Tony" DiNozzo, NCIS Special Agent in D.C., second in command

Guest cast 
 Shannon Cochran as Dr. Susan Rathburn
 Erin Krakow as Emily Moore
 Taylor Nichols as Chad Brunson
 Bobby Lee as Rio Syamsundin
 Cassius Willis as Russell Wallace
 Danielle Bisutti as Sarah Taylor
 Anthony Ruivivar as Agent Mark Ruiz
 Nicole Steinwedell as Allison Nelson
 Patrick St. Esprit as Roger Bates
 Nick Chinlund as Bruce Steadman
 Paulina Olszynski as Tiffany Williams
 Daniel J. Travanti as Nikita Aleksandr Reznikov / Garrison, Callen's father
  Karina Logue as LAPD Detective Ellen Whiting
 Matthew Del Negro as Jack Simon
 Malese Jow as Jennifer Kim

Production 
On May 11, 2015, CBS renewed the series for a seventh season. Originally, the episode "Defectors" was supposed to air on November 16, but the plot was too similar to the 2015 Paris attacks.

Episodes

Ratings

Home video release

References

External links 
  at CBS
 USA Network's NCIS: Los Angeles site 
 

2015 American television seasons
2016 American television seasons
07